The football team representing Zamalek Sporting Club of Giza, Egypt has played in many competitions on the continent of Africa.they won the African Cup of Champions Clubs five times, the CAF Cup Winners' Cup once, the CAF Super Cup twice, and the Afro-Asian Club Championship twice.

Performance in CAF competitions 
African Cup of Champions Clubs/CAF Champions League: 24 appearances
5 Times Champion : 1984, 1986, 1993, 1996, 2002

3 TimeS Runner-Up: 1994, 2016, 2020

2 Times Semi-Finalist: 1985, 2005

7 Times Quarter-Finalist: 1979, 1987, 1997, 2008, 2012, 2013, 2014

1 Time 2nd Round : 2003, 2017‚ 2021

4 Times 1st Round: 1989, 2004, 2007, 2011

African Cup Winners' Cup/CAF Confederation Cup: 7 appearances

2 Time Champion: 2000, 2019

2 Time Semi-Finalist: 1976, 2015

2 Times Quarter-Finalist: 1978, 2001

1 Time 1st Round: 2018

CAF Cup: 2 appearances

1 Time Semi-Finalist : 1999

1 Time 1st Round: 1998

CAF Super Cup: 5 appearances
4 Times Champion : 1994, 1997, 2003, 2020

1 Time Runner-Up : 2001

Afro-Asian Club Championship: 3 appearances

2 Times Champion : 1987, 1997

1 Time Runner-Up: 1994

Results
PR = Preliminary round
FR = First round
SR = Second round
PO = Play-off round
QF = Quarter-final
SF = Semi-final

Notes

Overall record

By competition

CAF Club rankings
Current

Club of the Century
In February 2014 administration of Zamalek announced the nickname of the club as the Club of the Century, as the most successful club of the 20th century in Africa (gaining 9 titles versus 7 for its closest rival).

CAF ranking of African Clubs titles at the end of 20th century

Ranking of the Century (CAF)

Ranking of the Century (IFFHS)
The competition that qualified for points in the ranking are the African Champions Cup (now African Champions League) with the following point awards 4 points for a win 2 points for a draw 0 points for a defeat, The CAF Cup (2 points for a win, 1 point for a draw. 0 points for a defeat), The Cup Winners Cup and the Confederations Cup (3 points for a win 1.5 points for a draw 0 points for a defeat), and the African Super Cup (3.5 points for a win, 1.75 points for a draw, 0 points for a defeat), (IFFHS) didn't calculated the Afro-Asian Super cup, which Zamalek won it for 2 times.

References

Zamalek SC
Egyptian football clubs in international competitions